A tigon is a hybrid cross between a female lion and a male tiger.

Tigon may also refer to:
Tigon British Film Productions, a British film production and distribution company
Tigon Studios, a video game production company